The deuterocanonical books (from the Greek meaning "belonging to the second canon") are books and passages considered by the Catholic Church, the Eastern Orthodox Church, the Oriental Orthodox Churches, and the Assyrian Church of the East to be canonical books of the Old Testament, but which Protestant denominations regard as apocrypha. They date from 300 BC to 100 AD, mostly from 200 BC to 70 AD, before the definite separation of the Christian church from Judaism. While the New Testament never directly quotes from or names these books, the apostles most frequently used and quoted the Septuagint, which includes them. Some say there is a correspondence of thought, and others see texts from these books being paraphrased, referred, or alluded to many times in the New Testament, depending in large measure on what is counted as a reference.

Although there is no scholarly consensus as to when the Hebrew Bible canon was fixed, some scholars hold that the Hebrew canon was established well before the 1st century AD – even as early as the 4th century BC, or by the Hasmonean dynasty (140–40 BC). 

The Septuagint translation of the Hebrew Bible into Greek, which the early Christian church used as its Old Testament, included all of the deuterocanonical books.  The term distinguished these books from both the protocanonical books (the books of the Hebrew canon) and the biblical apocrypha (books of Jewish origin that were sometimes read in Christian churches as scripture but which were not regarded as canonical).

The Council of Rome (382 AD) defined a list of books of scripture as canonical. It included most of the deuterocanonical books.

Hebrew Bible canon

The canon of modern Rabbinic Judaism excludes the deuterocanonical books. Albert J. Sundberg writes that Judaism did not exclude from their scriptures the deuterocanonicals and the additional Greek texts listed here.

Protestant Canon

The early Christian church largely relied upon the Septuagint in the canonization of the Christian Bible.  However, in the 16th century, Martin Luther argued that many of the received texts of the New Testament lacked the authority of the Gospels, and therefore proposed removing a number of books from  the New Testament, including Hebrews, James, Jude, and Revelation. While this proposal was never widely accepted among Protestants, he did nonetheless succeed in removing the  Deuterocanonical books, which had previously been deprecated by Jewish scholars.

List of deuterocanonicals
The deuterocanonical texts held as canonical for the Catholic Church and the Eastern Orthodox Church are:
 Tobit
 Judith
 Baruch
 Sirach
 1 Maccabees
 2 Maccabees
 Wisdom
 Additions to Esther, Daniel, and Baruch:
 Esther:
 Fulfillment of Mordecai's Dream (Esther 10:4–13)
 Interpretation of Mordecai's Dream (Vulgate Esther 11)
 Conspiracy of the Two Eunuchs (Vulgate Esther 12)
 Letter of Aman and the Prayer of Mordecai to the Jews (Vulgate Esther 13)
 The Prayer of Esther (Vulgate Esther 14)
 Esther Comes into the King's Presence (Vulgate Esther 15)
 Letter of King Artaxerxes (Vulgate Esther 16)
 Daniel:
 The Prayer of Azariah and Song of the Three Holy Children (Septuagint Daniel 3:24–90)
 Susanna and the Elders (Septuagint prologue, Vulgate Daniel 13)
 Bel and the Dragon (Septuagint epilogue, Vulgate Daniel 14)
 Baruch:
 Letter of Jeremiah (Baruch 6)
 There is a different numbering of Psalms, but otherwise the Catholic Psalms are the same as the Protestant and Jewish Psalms
Canonical only for the Eastern Orthodox Church:
 Prayer of Manasseh
 1 Esdras
 2 Esdras
 3 Maccabees
 4 Maccabees as an appendix
 Additions to Psalms:
 Psalm 151

Dates of composition

Historical background

Deuterocanonical is a term coined in 1566 by the theologian Sixtus of Siena, who had converted to Catholicism from Judaism, to describe scriptural texts considered canonical by the Catholic Church, but which recognition was considered "secondary". For Sixtus, this term included portions of both Old and New Testaments (Sixtus considers the final chapter of the Gospel of Mark as 'deuterocanonical'); and he also applies the term to the Book of Esther from the canon of the Hebrew Bible. The term was then taken up by other writers to apply specifically to those books of the Old Testament which had been recognised as canonical by the Councils of Rome (382 AD), Hippo (393 AD), Carthage (397 AD and 419 AD), Florence (1442 AD) and Trent (1546 AD), but which were not in the Hebrew canon.

Forms of the term deuterocanonical were adopted after the 16th century by the Eastern Orthodox Church to denote canonical books of the Septuagint not in the Hebrew Bible (a wider selection than that adopted by the Council of Trent), and also by the Ethiopian Orthodox Tewahedo Church to apply to works believed to be of Jewish origin translated in the Old Testament of the Ethiopic Bible; a wider selection still.

The acceptance of some of these books among early Christians was widespread, though not universal, and surviving Bibles from the early Church always include, with varying degrees of recognition, books now called deuterocanonical. Some say that their canonicity seems not to have been doubted in the Church until it was challenged by Jews after 100 AD, sometimes postulating a hypothetical Council of Jamnia. Regional councils in the West published official canons that included these books as early as the 4th and 5th centuries.

The Catholic Encyclopedia states:

Meanwhile, "the protocanonical books of the Old Testament correspond with those of the Bible of the Hebrews, and the Old Testament as received by Protestants. The deuterocanonical (deuteros, "second") are those whose Scriptural character was contested in some quarters, but which long ago gained a secure footing in the Bible of the Catholic Church, though those of the Old Testament are classed by Protestants as the "Apocrypha". These consist of seven books: Tobias, Judith, Baruch, Ecclesiasticus, Wisdom, First and Second Machabees; also certain additions to Esther and Daniel."

Dead Sea scrolls
Sirach, whose Hebrew text was already known from the Cairo Geniza, has been found in two scrolls (2QSir or 2Q18, 11QPs_a or 11Q5) in Hebrew. Another Hebrew scroll of Sirach has been found in Masada (MasSir). Five fragments from the Book of Tobit have been found in Qumran written in Aramaic and in one written in Hebrew (papyri 4Q, nos. 196–200). The Letter of Jeremiah (or Baruch chapter 6) has been found in cave 7 (papyrus 7Q2) in Greek. It has been theorized by recent scholars that the Qumran library (of approximately 1,100 manuscripts found in the eleven caves at Qumran) was not entirely produced at Qumran, but may have included part of the library of the Jerusalem Temple, that may have been hidden in the caves for safekeeping at the time the Temple was destroyed by Romans in 70 AD.

Influence of the Septuagint
Deuterocanonical and Apocryphal books included in the Septuagint are:

The large majority of Old Testament references in the New Testament are taken from the Koine Greek Septuagint (LXX), editions of which include the deuterocanonical books, as well as apocrypha – both of which are called collectively  ("Readable, namely worthy of reading"). No two Septuagint codices contain the same apocrypha.

Greek Psalm manuscripts from the fifth century contain three New Testament "psalms": the Magnificat, the Benedictus, the Nunc dimittis from Luke's birth narrative, and the conclusion of the hymn that begins with the "Gloria in Excelsis". Beckwith states that manuscripts of anything like the capacity of Codex Alexandrinus were not used in the first centuries of the Christian era, and believes that the comprehensive codices of the Septuagint, which start appearing in the 4th century AD, are all of Christian origin.

In the New Testament, Hebrews 11:35 is understood by some as referring to an event that was recorded in one of the deuterocanonical books, 2 Maccabees. For instance, the author of Hebrews references oral tradition which spoke of an Old Testament prophet who was sawn in half in Hebrews 11:37, two verses after the 2nd Maccabees reference. Other New Testament authors such as Paul also reference or quote period literature.

Influence of early authors
The Jewish historian Josephus speaks of there being 22 books in the canon of the Hebrew Bible, reported also by the Christian bishop Athanasius.

Origen of Alexandria also records 22 canonical books of the Hebrew Bible cited by Eusebius; among them are the Epistle of Jeremiah and the Maccabees as canonical books.

Eusebius wrote in his Church History that Bishop Melito of Sardis in the 2nd century AD considered the deuterocanonical Wisdom of Solomon as part of the Old Testament and that it was considered canonical by Jews and Christians. On the other hand, the contrary claim has been made: "In the catalogue of Melito, presented by Eusebius, after Proverbs, the word Wisdom occurs, which nearly all commentators have been of opinion is only another name for the same book, and not the name of the book now called 'The Wisdom of Solomon'."

Cyril of Jerusalem in his Catechetical Lectures cites as canonical books "Jeremiah one, including Baruch and Lamentations and the Epistle (of Jeremiah)".

In Athanasius's canonical books list (367 AD) the Book of Baruch and the Letter of Jeremiah are included and Esther is omitted. At the same time, he mentioned that certain other books, including four deuterocanonical books (the Wisdom of Solomon, the Wisdom of Sirach, Judith and Tobit), the book of Esther and also the Didache and The Shepherd of Hermas, while not being part of the Canon, "were appointed by the Fathers to be read". He excluded what he called "apocryphal writings" entirely.

Epiphanius of Salamis mentions that "there are 27 books given the Jews by God, but they are counted as 22, however, like the letters of their Hebrew alphabet, because ten books are doubled and reckoned as five". He wrote in his  that Jews had in their books the deuterocanonical Epistle of Jeremiah and Baruch, both combined with Jeremiah and Lamentations in only one book. While Wisdom of Sirach and the Wisdom of Solomon were books of disputed canonicity.

Augustine writes in his book On Christian Doctrine (Book II Chapter 8) that two books of Maccabees, Tobias, Judith, Wisdom of Solomon and Ecclesiasticus are canonical books.

According to the monk Rufinus of Aquileia the deuterocanonical books were not called canonical but ecclesiastical books. In this category Rufinus includes the Wisdom of Solomon, Sirach, Judith, Tobit and two books of Maccabees. Rufinus makes no mention of Baruch or the Epistle of Jeremiah.

Pope Innocent I (405 AD) sent a letter to the bishop of Toulouse citing deuterocanonical books as a part of the Old Testament canon.

In the 7th century Latin document the Muratorian fragment, which some scholars actually believe to be a copy of an earlier 170 AD Greek original, the book of the Wisdom of Solomon is counted by the church.

Synods
In later copyings of the canons of the Council of Laodicea (from 364 AD) a canon list became appended to Canon 59, likely before the mid fifth century, which affirmed that Jeremiah, and Baruch, the Lamentations, and the Epistle (of Jeremiah) were canonical, while excluding the other deuterocanonical books.

According to Decretum Gelasianum, which is a work written by an anonymous scholar between 519 and 553, the Council of Rome (382 AD) cites a list of books of scripture presented as having been made canonical. This list mentions all the deuterocanonical books except Baruch and the Letter of Jeremiah as a part of the Old Testament canon:

The Synod of Hippo (in 393 AD), followed by the Council of Carthage (397) and the Council of Carthage (419), may be the first councils that explicitly accepted the first canon which includes a selection of books that did not appear in the Hebrew Bible; the councils were under significant influence of Augustine of Hippo, who regarded the canon as already closed.

Canon XXIV from the Synod of Hippo (in 393 AD) records the scriptures which are considered canonical; the Old Testament books as follows:

On 28 August 397, the Council of Carthage confirmed the canon issued at Hippo; the recurrence of the Old Testament part is stated:

In 419 AD, the Council of Carthage in its canon 24 lists the deuterocanonical books except Baruch and the Epistle of Jeremiah as canonical scripture:

The Apostolic Canons approved by the Eastern Council in Trullo in 692 AD (not recognized by the Catholic Church) states as venerable and sacred the first three books of Maccabees and Wisdom of Sirach.

The Roman Catholic Council of Florence (1442) promulgated a list of the books of the Bible, including the books of Judith, Esther, Wisdom, Ecclesiasticus, Baruch and two books of the Maccabees as Canonical books:

The Roman Catholic Council of Trent (1546) adopted an understanding of the canons of these previous councils as corresponding to its own list of deuterocanonical books:

Influence of Jerome

Jerome in one of his Vulgate prologues describes a canon which excludes the deuterocanonical books. In these prologues, Jerome mentions all of the deuterocanonical and apocryphal works by name as being apocryphal or "not in the canon" except for Prayer of Manasses and Baruch. He mentions Baruch by name in his Prologue to Jeremiah and notes that it is neither read nor held among the Hebrews, but does not explicitly call it apocryphal or "not in the canon". The inferior status to which the deuterocanonical books were relegated by authorities like Jerome is seen by some as being due to a rigid conception of canonicity, one demanding that a book, to be entitled to this supreme dignity, must be received by all, must have the sanction of Jewish antiquity, and must moreover be adapted not only to edification, but also to the "confirmation of the doctrine of the Church".

J. N. D. Kelly states that "Jerome, conscious of the difficulty of arguing with Jews on the basis of books they spurned and anyhow regarding the Hebrew original as authoritative, was adamant that anything not found in it was 'to be classed among the apocrypha', not in the canon; later he grudgingly conceded that the Church read some of these books for edification, but not to support doctrine."

Jerome's Vulgate included the deuterocanonical books as well as apocrypha. Jerome referenced and quoted from some as scripture despite describing them as "not in the canon". Michael Barber asserts that, although Jerome was once suspicious of the apocrypha, he later viewed them as scripture. Barber argues that this is clear from Jerome's epistles; he cites Jerome's letter to Eustochium, in which Jerome quotes Sirach 13:2. Elsewhere Jerome apparently also refers to Baruch, the Story of Susannah and Wisdom as scripture. Henry Barker states that Jerome quotes the Apocrypha with marked respect, and even as "Scripture", giving them an ecclesiastical if not a canonical position and use. Luther also wrote introductions to the books of the Apocrypha, and occasionally quoted from some to support an argument.

In his prologue to Judith, without using the word canon, Jerome mentioned that Judith was held to be scriptural by the First Council of Nicaea.

In his reply to Rufinus, Jerome affirmed that he was consistent with the choice of the church regarding which version of the deuterocanonical portions of Daniel to use, which the Jews of his day did not include:

Thus Jerome acknowledged the principle by which the canon would be settled—the judgment of the Church (at least the local churches in this case) rather than his own judgment or the judgment of Jews; though concerning translation of Daniel to Greek, he wondered why one should use the version of a translator whom he regarded as a heretic and judaizer (Theodotion).

The Vulgate is also important as the touchstone of the canon concerning which parts of books are canonical. When the Council of Trent confirmed the books included in the first canon, it qualified the books as being "entire with all their parts, as they have been used to be read in the Catholic Church, and as they are contained in the old Latin vulgate edition". This decree was clarified somewhat by Pope Pius XI on 2 June 1927, who allowed that the Comma Johanneum was open to dispute.

The Council of Trent also ratified the Vulgate Bible as the official Latin version of the Bible for the Roman Catholic Church.

Deuterocanonical and Apocryphal books included in the Latin Vulgate are:

Masoretic Text
The existence of the Septuagint, Samaritan Pentateuch, and the Peshitta versions of the Hebrew scriptures demonstrate that different versions of Judaism used different texts, and it is debated which is closest to the Urtext (a theoretical "original" text from which these all emerged from). The Dead Sea Scrolls contain the Deuterocanonical books and the 10th century AD Masoretic is the first Jewish text to exclude them. Since the Enlightenment, it was wrongly believed that the Masoretic Text was the "original" Hebrew Bible when this was in fact a medieval version created by the Masoretes. The Septuagint has been in use since the 4th century BC, so it predates the Masoretic text by over millennium. Various versions of the Masoretic persisted for a couple of hundred years until the version created by the Ben-Ascher family of Tiberias (the Codex of Aleppo from 920) became the standard. The oldest completely preserved manuscript of the Masoretic text is the Codex Leningradensis from the year 1008 AD. The Septuagint was the authoritative Jewish scriptures of the Second Temple Judaism from which the early Christians emerged from, hence the Christian Bible contained these deuterocanonical books until Martin Luther, assuming the Masoretic text to be the original, removed them to match this new Jewish canon. Rabbinic Judaism is a newer form of Judaism that created the Masoretic text in part to deter a Christian reading of the Old Testament.

In the Catholic Church

The Catholic Church considers that in the Council of Rome in 382 AD, under the Papacy of Damasus I, was defined the complete canon of the Bible, accepting 46 books for the Old Testament, including what the Reformed Churches consider as deuterocanonical books, and 27 books for the New Testament. Based in this first canon, Saint Jerome compiled and translated the 73 books of the Bible into Latin, later known as the Vulgate Bible version, which has been considered during many centuries as one of the official Bible translations of the Catholic Church. The Synod of Hippo (in 393 AD), followed by the Council of Carthage (397) and the Council of Carthage (419), also explicitly accepted the first canon from the Council of Rome; these councils were under significant influence of Augustine of Hippo, who also regarded the Biblical canon as already closed. The Roman Catholic Council of Florence (1442) confirmed the first canon too, while the Council of Trent (1546) elevated the first canon to dogma.

Protestant theologian Philip Schaff states that "the Council of Hippo in 393, and the third (according to another reckoning the sixth) Council of Carthage in 397, under the influence of Augustine, who attended both, fixed the catholic canon of the Holy Scriptures, including the Apocrypha of the Old Testament, ...This decision of the transmarine church, however, was subject to ratification; and the concurrence of the Roman See it received when Innocent I and Gelasius I (AD 414) repeated the same index of biblical books." Schaff says that this canon remained undisturbed till the 16th century, and was sanctioned by the Council of Trent at its fourth session, although as the Catholic Encyclopedia reports, "in the Latin Church, all through the Middle Ages we find evidence of hesitation about the character of the deuterocanonicals. ... Few are found to unequivocally acknowledge their canonicity," but that the countless manuscript copies of the Vulgate produced by these ages, with a slight, probably accidental, exception, uniformly embrace the complete Roman Catholic Old Testament. Subsequent research qualifies this latter statement, in that a distinct tradition of large format pandect bibles has been identified as having been promoted by the 11th and 12th century reforming Papacy for presentation to monasteries in Italy; and now commonly termed 'Atlantic Bibles' on account of their very great size. While not all these bibles present a consistent reformed Vulgate text, they generally exclude the deuterocanonical books.

Baruch 
Baruch and the Letter of Jeremiah, appear in the canon lists of the Council of Laodicea, Athanasius (367 AD), Cyril of Jerusalem, and Epiphanius of Salamis they are not present in the canons done by Innocent I and Gelasius I, nor are present in any complete Vulgate Bibles earlier than the 9th century; and even after that date, do not become common in the Vulgate Old Testament until the 13th century. In the Old Latin version of the Bible, these two works appear to have been incorporated into the Book of Jeremiah, and Latin Fathers of the 4th century and earlier always cite their texts as being from that book. However, when Jerome translated Jeremiah afresh from the Hebrew text, which is considerably longer than the Greek Septuagint text and with chapters in a different order, he steadfastly refused to incorporate either Baruch or the Letter of Jeremiah from the Greek. In the 9th century these two works were reintroduced into the Vulgate Bibles produced under the influence of Theodulf of Orleans, originally as additional chapters to the Vulgate book of Jeremiah. Subsequently, and especially in the Paris Bibles of the 13th century, they are found together as a single, combined book after Lamentations.

Esdras 
For the Roman Catholic Church and Protestant Churches, Greek Esdras is now considered apocryphal, while the Orthodox Church considers it as canonical. The earlier canonical status of this book in the Western church can be less easy to track, as references to Esdras in canon lists and citations may refer either to this book, or to Greek Ezra–Nehemiah, or both together. In the surviving Greek pandect Bibles of the 4th and 5th centuries, Greek Esdras always stands as 'Esdras A' while the Greek translation of the whole of canonical Ezra–Nehemiah stands as 'Esdras B'; and the same is found in the surviving witness of the Old Latin Bible. When Latin fathers of the early church cite quotations from the biblical 'Book of Ezra' it is overwhelmingly 'First Ezra/Esdras A' to which they refer, as in Augustine 'City of God' 18:36. Citations of the 'Nehemiah' sections of Old Latin Second Ezra/'Esdras B' are much rarer; and no Old Latin citations from the 'Ezra' sections of Second Ezra/'Esdras B' are known before Bede in the 8th century. Consequently Gallagher and Meade conclude that "when the ancient canon lists, whether Greek or Latin, mention two books of Esdras, they must have in mind the books known in the LXX and Old Latin as Esdras A and Esdras B; i.e. our 1 Esdras and Ezra-Nehemiah."

In his prologue to Ezra Jerome refers to four books of Ezra in the Latin tradition. Jerome's first and second Latin books of Ezra are those of the Old Latin Bible - corresponding to Greek Esdras and Ezra-Nehemiah in the Septuagint; these two books he considers each to be a corrupt version of the single Hebrew book of Ezra, so he claims that his Vulgate version of Ezra from the Hebrew replaces both of them. Jerome condemns the third and fourth Latin books of Ezra as apocrypha; his third book must correspond to the Jewish Apocolypse of Ezra while the fourth book is likely to comprise other material from Latin Ezra.

From the 9th century, occasional Latin Vulgate manuscripts are found in which Jerome's single Ezra text is split to form the separate books of Ezra and Nehemiah; and in the Paris Bibles of the 13th century this split has become universal, with Esdras A being reintroduced as '3 Esdras' and Latin Esdras being added as '4 Esdras'. At the Council of Trent neither '3 Esdras' nor '4 Esdras' were accepted as canonical books, but were eventually printed in the section of 'Apocrypha' in the Sixto-Clementine Vulgate, along with the Prayer of Manasses.

The Council of Trent in 1546 stated the list of books included in the canon as it had been set out in the Council of Florence. In respect to the deuterocanonical books this list conformed with the canon lists of Western synods of the late 4th century, other than including Baruch with the Letter of Jeremiah (Baruch chapter 6) as a single book. While the majority at Trent supported this decision there were participants in the minority who disagreed with accepting any other than the protocanonical books in the canon. Among the minority, at Trent, were Cardinals Seripando and Cajetan, the latter an opponent of Luther at Augsburg.

In Eastern Orthodoxy 
The Eastern Orthodox Churches have traditionally included all the books of the Septuagint in their Old Testaments. The Greeks use the word  ("readable, worthy to be read") to describe the books of the Greek Septuagint that are not present in the Hebrew Bible. When Eastern Orthodox theologians use the term "deuterocanonical", it is important to note that the meaning is not identical to the Roman Catholic usage. In Eastern Orthodox Christianity, deuterocanonical means that a book is part of the corpus of the Old Testament (i.e. is read during the services) but has secondary authority. In other words, deutero (second) applies to authority or witnessing power, whereas in Roman Catholicism, deutero applies to chronology (the fact that these books were confirmed later), not to authority.

The Eastern Orthodox canon includes the deuterocanonical books accepted by Roman Catholics plus Psalm 151, the Prayer of Manasseh, 3 Maccabees and 1 Esdras (also included in the Clementine Vulgate), while Baruch is divided from the Epistle of Jeremiah, making a total of 49 Old Testament books in contrast with the Protestant 39-book canon.

The Eastern Orthodox synod, the Synod of Jerusalem, held in 1672 receive as its canon the books found in the Septuagint, and in the Patristic, Byzantine, and liturgical tradition. The Synod declared the Eastern Orthodox canon as follows:

specifically, "The Wisdom of Solomon," "Judith," "Tobit," "The History of the Dragon" [Bel and the Dragon], "The History of Susanna," "The Maccabees," and "The Wisdom of Sirach." For we judge these also to be with the other genuine Books of Divine Scripture genuine parts of Scripture. For ancient custom, or rather the Catholic Church, which has delivered to us as genuine the Sacred Gospels and the other Books of Scripture, has undoubtedly delivered these also as parts of Scripture, and the denial of these is the rejection of those. And if, perhaps, it seems that not always have all of these been considered on the same level as the others, yet nevertheless these also have been counted and reckoned with the rest of Scripture, both by Synods and by many of the most ancient and eminent Theologians of the Universal Church. All of these we also judge to be Canonical Books, and confess them to be Sacred Scripture.

Other texts printed in Eastern Orthodox Bibles are included as an appendix, which is not the same in all churches; the appendix contains 4 Maccabees in Greek-language bibles, while it contains 2 Esdras in Slavonic-language and Russian-language.

Ethiopian Miaphysitism

In the Ethiopic Bible used by the Ethiopian Orthodox Church (an Oriental Orthodox Church), those books of the Old Testament that are still counted as canonical, but which are not agreed upon by all other Churches, are often set in a separate section titled "Deeyutrokanoneekal" (ዲዩትሮካኖኒካል), which is cognate with "Deuterocanonical". The Ethiopian Orthodox Deuterocanon, in addition to the standard set listed above, and with the books of Esdras and Prayer of Minasse, also includes some books that are still held canonical by only the Ethiopian Church, including Enoch or Henok (I Enoch), Kufale (Jubilees) and 1, 2 and 3 Meqabyan (which are sometimes wrongly confused with the "Books of Maccabees").

In Christian Churches having their origins in the Reformation

Anabaptist Churches
Anabaptists use the Luther Bible, which contains the Apocrypha as intertestamental books, which has much overlap with the Catholic deuterocanonical books; Amish wedding ceremonies include "the retelling of the marriage of Tobias and Sarah in the Apocrypha".

The fathers of Anabaptism, such as Menno Simmons, quoted "them [the Apocrypha] with the same authority and nearly the same frequency as books of the Hebrew Bible" and the texts regarding the martyrdoms under Antiochus IV in 1 Maccabees and 2 Maccabees are held in high esteem by the Anabaptists, who faced persecution in their history.

Anglican Communion
The Thirty-nine Articles of Religion of the Church of England lists the deuterocanonical books as suitable to be read for "example of life and instruction of manners, but yet doth not apply them to establish any doctrine". The early lectionaries of the Anglican Church (as included in the Book of Common Prayer of 1662) included the deuterocanonical books amongst the cycle of readings, and passages from them were used regularly in services (such as the Kyrie Pantokrator and the Benedicite).

Readings from the deuterocanonical books are now included many modern lectionaries in the Anglican Communion, based on the Revised Common Lectionary (in turn based on the post-conciliar Roman Catholic lectionary), though alternative readings from protocanonical books are also provided.
There is a great deal of overlap between the Apocrypha section of the original 1611 King James Bible and the Catholic deuterocanon, but the two are distinct. 

The Apocrypha section of the original 1611 King James Bible includes, in addition to the deuterocanonical books, the following three books, which were not included in the list of the canonical books by the Council of Trent:
 1 Esdras (Vulgate 3 Esdras)
 2 Esdras (Vulgate 4 Esdras)
 Prayer of Manasseh

These books make up the Apocrypha section of the Clementine Vulgate: 3 Esdras (a.k.a. 1 Esdras); 4 Esdras (a.k.a. 2 Esdras); and the Prayer of Manasseh, where they are specifically described as "outside of the series of the canon". The 1609 Douai Bible includes them in an appendix, but they have not been included in English Catholic Bibles since the Challoner revision of the Douai Bible in 1750. 

Using the word apocrypha (Greek: "hidden away") to describe texts, although not necessarily pejorative, implies that the writings in question should not be included in the canon of the Bible. This classification commingles them with certain non-canonical gospels and New Testament apocrypha. The Society of Biblical Literature recommends the use of the term deuterocanonical books instead of Apocrypha in academic writing.

Lutheran Churches
Luther termed the deuterocanonical books "Apocrypha, that is, books which are not considered equal to the Holy Scriptures, but are useful and good to read." These are included in copies of the Luther Bible as intertestamental books between the Old Testament and New Testament.

Methodist Churches and Moravian Churches
The first Methodist liturgical book, The Sunday Service of the Methodists, employs verses from the biblical apocrypha, such as in the Eucharistic liturgy.

The Revised Common Lectionary, in use by most mainline Protestants including Methodists and Moravians, lists readings from the biblical apocrypha in the liturgical kalendar, although alternate Old Testament scripture lessons are provided.

Presbyterian Churches
The Westminster Confession of Faith, a Calvinist document that serves as a systematic summary of doctrine for the Church of Scotland and other Presbyterian Churches worldwide, recognizes only the sixty-six books of the Protestant canon as authentic scripture. Chapter 1, Article 3 of the Confession reads: "The books commonly called Apocrypha, not being of divine inspiration, are no part of the Canon of Scripture; and therefore are of no authority in the Church of God, nor to be any otherwise approved, or made use of, than other human writings."

Reformed Churches
The Belgic Confession, used in Reformed churches, devotes a section (Article 6) to "the difference between the canonical and apocryphal books" and says of them: "All which the Church may read and take instruction from, so far as they agree with the canonical books; but they are far from having such power and efficacy as that we may from their testimony confirm any point of faith or of the Christian religion; much less to detract from the authority of the other sacred books."

New Testament deuterocanonicals

The term deuterocanonical is sometimes used to describe the canonical antilegomena, those books of the New Testament which, like the deuterocanonicals of the Old Testament, were not universally accepted by the early Church.

Jimmy Akin calls these books "New Testament deuterocanonicals",

The antilegomena or "disputed writings" were widely read in the Early Church and included:

 The Epistle to the Hebrews
 The Epistle of James
 The Second Epistle of Peter
 The Second Epistle of John
 The Third Epistle of John
 The Epistle of Jude
 The Book of Revelation
 The Apocalypse of Peter
 The Acts of Paul
 The Shepherd of Hermas
 The Epistle of Barnabas
 The Didache

Notes

See also

 Biblical apocrypha
 Biblical canon
 Pseudepigrapha

References

Further reading
 Harrington, Daniel J. Invitation to the Apocrypha. Grand Rapids, Michigan: W.B. Eerdmans Publishing Co., 1999. 
 Roach, Corwin C. The Apocrypha: the Hidden Books of the Bible. Cincinnati, Ohio:  Forward Movement Publications, 1966  – Concerns the Deuterocanonical writings (Apocrypha), according to Anglican usage.

External links

Prophecies in the Deuterocanonical books
Protestants defending the Deuterocanonical books
Defending the Deuterocanonicals by Jimmy Akin
Five common arguments Protestants give for rejecting the Deuterocanonicals (webarchive link)
Deuterocanon Use in New Testament
Deuterocanonical books – Full text from Saint Takla Haymanot Church Website (also available, the full text in Arabic)
The Apocrypha: Inspired of God?

 
Biblical criticism
Development of the Christian biblical canon
Christian terminology
Ancient Hebrew texts